General elections were held in Malta on 7 March 1899. All seats had only a single candidate.

Background
The elections were held under the Knutsford Constitution. Ten members were elected from single-member constituencies, whilst a further three members were elected to represent nobility and landowners, graduates and the Chamber of Commerce. The seat previously reserved for clerics was abolished.

Results
A total of 9,581 people were registered to vote, although no votes were cast due to all candidates being unopposed.

References

1899
Malta
1899 in Malta
Single-candidate elections
Uncontested elections
March 1899 events